The term armed merchant ship may describe a number of similar ship modifications intended for significantly different missions. The term armed merchantman is generally used.

 East Indiaman describes late 18th and early 19th-century sailing ships engaged in trade while carrying guns similar to contemporary warships.
 Defensively Equipped Merchant Ships were civilian-crewed cargo ships carrying a small number of military personnel to operate an anti-submarine gun and anti-aircraft machine guns during the world wars of the early 20th century.
 Auxiliary cruisers were cargo ships commissioned as naval vessels with a military crew, converted to carry the guns of a light cruiser, and sometimes used as Merchant raiders.
 Armed merchant cruisers were fast passenger liners commissioned as naval vessels with a military crew and converted to carry the guns of a light cruiser.
 Naval trawlers were fishing trawlers commissioned as naval vessels with a military crew and equipped for minesweeping or anti-submarine escort.
 Q-ships were small civilian ships commissioned as naval vessels with a military crew, but retaining their original appearance while carrying concealed anti-submarine weapons.
 Armed boarding steamers were merchant steamers converted by the United Kingdom for boarding enemy vessels.

Sources

Notes 

Auxiliary cruisers
Ship types